BioPharm Systems is an American privately owned IT consulting and managed services provider (MSP) headquartered in San Mateo, California that focuses on the life sciences industry. The company specializes in the implementation, integration, migration, upgrade, and private cloud hosting of Oracle's clinical trial management system, drug safety and pharmacovigilance, clinical data warehousing and analytics, clinical data management, and electronic data capture systems.

History
Founded in 1995 by president and CEO Alex Sefanov around the corner from Oracle's headquarters in Silicon Valley, BioPharm is headquartered in California and has offices in the United States and United Kingdom. Mr. Sefanov founded the company with his personal savings after working as an IT consultant for several major biotechnology and pharmaceutical companies. He was inspired to start the firm after working closely with Oracle and their first clinical trial software application, Oracle Clinical.

In April 2014, BioPharm Systems was acquired by information technology firm Perficient for $17.6 million.

Products
BioPharm offers various hosting options, such as dedicated hosting, shared hosting, and software as a service (SaaS) out of a data center in San Jose and a disaster recovery data center near Sacramento. BioPharm's services include implementing and integrating client applications and systems, as well as providing validation, training, and application support services. The company complies with the relevant regulations including Title 21 CFR Part 11.

References

External links
 
 InsideView Company Profile

Business process outsourcing companies
Software companies established in 1995
Companies based in San Mateo, California
Computational biology
Cloud applications
Clinical data management
Distributed data storage
International information technology consulting firms
Information technology companies of the United Kingdom
Information technology consulting firms of the United States
Software companies based in the San Francisco Bay Area
Technology companies based in the San Francisco Bay Area
Defunct software companies of the United States